Sulafjorden is a fjord (more accurately, a sound) in Sula Municipality in Møre og Romsdal county, Norway. It is located on the border of Sula Municipality and Hareid Municipality. The great Storfjorden flows out into the Sulafjorden which then flows out into the Breidsundet sound, and on into the ocean. The island of Sula sits on the northeast side of the fjord and the island of Hareidlandet is to the southwest. The main settlements along the fjord include the villages of Brandal, Hareid, and Hjørungavåg, all on Hareidlandet. The island of Sula has very few inhabitants along the Sulafjorden.

See also
 List of Norwegian fjords

References

Fjords of Møre og Romsdal
Sula, Møre og Romsdal
Hareid